The 1960 Albanian National Championship was the 23rd season of the Albanian National Championship, the top professional league for association football clubs, since its establishment in 1930.

Overview
It was contested by 10 teams, and Dinamo Tirana won the championship.

League standings

Note: '17 Nëntori' is KF Tirana, 'Labinoti' is KS Elbasani and 'Lokomotiva Durrës' is Teuta

Results

References
Albania - List of final tables (RSSSF)

Kategoria Superiore seasons
1
Albania
Albania